Joseph Deeley Chatterton (14 February 1867 – 17 November 1886) was an English cricketer who played for Derbyshire between 1884 and 1886.

Chatterton was born in Thornsett, the son of David Chatterton, a cotton mill fireman, and his wife Hannah.

Chatterton made his debut for Derbyshire in the 1884 season at the age of 17 against Sussex, when he made a duck in both innings. He played two matches in the 1885 season and in the 1886 season played eight first-class and two other matches for Derbyshire.

Chatterton was a right-handed batsman and played 22 innings in 11 first-class matches with an average of 5.40 and a top score of 21. He was a right-arm slow bowler and took 5 wickets for an average of 23.80.

Chatterton died in Derby at the age of 19 years. His brother, William, over five years his senior, was a former Derbyshire captain and one-time England Test cricketer.

References

1867 births
1886 deaths
English cricketers
Derbyshire cricketers
People from New Mills
Cricketers from Derbyshire